The Marjorie Sterrett Battleship Fund Award is presented annually by the U.S. Navy's Chief of Naval Operations to one ship in the U.S. Atlantic Fleet and one in the U.S. Pacific Fleet.

Generally the recipient is the ship with the highest score in the fleet's annual competitions for Battle Effectiveness Awards, and is therefore often thought of as the fleet's most battle-ready ship. This isn't strictly correct, because it has been the policy to rotate eligibility for the award annually among the various type commands (aircraft carriers, submarines, amphibious ships, etc.).

The award includes a small monetary stipend (about $500 in 2004). Commanding officers receiving the award must put the money into the ship's recreation fund, where it can be spent on athletic equipment, prizes for athletic or marksmanship competitions, recreation room furniture, dances, parties, and similar recreational activities.

History
The Marjorie Sterrett Battleship Fund was established in 1917 by the Tribune Association. It was initiated by a contribution which accompanied the following letter, printed on February 4, 1916:

The letter was written during the buildup to America's entry into World War I, and it generated a huge response. Former president Theodore Roosevelt responded immediately with a handwritten letter and a dollar contribution; within a few days he met with Marjorie in Manhattan. The Tribune printed the name of every contributor, and newspapers across the country reprinted Marjorie's letter and received additional donations.

Ultimately 200,000 dimes were collected, each typically in the name of a child or a contributor's yet-to-be born grandchild. The money was offered to the Navy, but Secretary Josephus Daniels at first rejected it, citing legal prohibitions. A law was soon enacted allowing the Navy Department to accept the money, and by early 1918 the $20,000   ( today) had been transferred to the government.

Prior to World War II, income from the fund was used to pay prizes annually to turret and gun crews making the highest scores in short-range battle practice, and to submarine crews making the highest scores in torpedo firing.

Since the end of World War II, the Navy has emphasized readiness and fitness of the ship rather than competition between individual departments.

Marjorie Sterrett-Raun died in March 1927 in Wattsburg, Pennsylvania.

List of Post-WWII Winners

1948 was the first post-World War II year in which awards were made. Awards were discontinued in 1951 due to the Korean War, and were not reinstated until 1958.

14 ships received the award in 1961 and 1962.

The 1963 ship history for  reported that they were awarded the (presumably 1962) Marjorie Sterrett Battleship Fund Award in August 1963.

References
OPNAVINST 3590.11F
 New York Tribune, February 4–13, 1916
 New York Times, February 11, 1916
 Wall Street Journal, January 13, 1917

Notes

Awards and decorations of the United States Navy
New-York Tribune
1917 establishments in the United States
Awards established in 1917